Holopyga is a genus of cuckoo wasps (insects belonging to the family Chrysididae).

Species
Species within this genus include:
 Holopyga amoenula  (Dahlbom, 1845) 
 Holopyga austrialis  Linsenmaier, 1959 
 Holopyga chrysonota  (Förster, 1853) 
 Holopyga cypruscula  Linsenmaier, 1959 
 Holopyga duplicata  Linsenmaier, 1997 
 Holopyga fastuosa  (Lucas, 1849) 
 Holopyga fervida  (Fabricius, 1781) 
 Holopyga gogorzae  Trautmann, 1926 
 Holopyga guadarrama  Linsenmaier, 1987 
 Holopyga hortobagyensis  Móczár, 1983 
 Holopyga ignicollis  Dahlbom, 1854 
 Holopyga inflammata  (Förster, 1853) 
 Holopyga insperata  Mocsáry, 1889 
 Holopyga jurinei  Chevrier, 1862 
 Holopyga lucida  (Lepeletier, 1806) 
 Holopyga mauritanica  (Lucas, 1849) 
 Holopyga mavromoustakisi  Enslin, 1939 
 Holopyga merceti  Kimsey, 1991 
 Holopyga metallica  (Dahlbom, 1854) 
 Holopyga minuma  Linsenmaier, 1959 
 Holopyga miranda  Abeille de Perrin, 1878 
 Holopyga mlokosiewitzi  (Radoszkowski, 1876) 
 Holopyga parvicornis  Linsenmaier, 1987 
 Holopyga pseudovata  Linsenmaier, 1987 
 Holopyga punctatissima  Dahlbom, 1854 
 Holopyga rubra  Linsenmaier, 1999 
 Holopyga sardoa  Invrea, 1952 
 Holopyga trapeziphora  Linsenmaier, 1987 
 Holopyga vigora  Linsenmaier, 1959

References 

Hymenoptera genera
Chrysidinae
Taxa named by Anders Gustaf Dahlbom